The Men's 400m event at the 2010 South American Games was held on March 20, with the heats at 11:30 and the Final at 18:45.

Medalists

Records

Results
Results were published.

Heats

Heat 1

Heat 2

†: Not eligible for the South American Under-23 Championships.

Final

†: Not eligible for the South American Under-23 Championships.

See also
2010 South American Under-23 Championships in Athletics

References

External links
Heat 1 
Heat 2 
Final

400M